is a Japanese former professional boxer who competed from 2006 to 2016. He held the WBC light-flyweight title between 2015 and 2016.

Professional career

Kimura Turned professional in 2006 and went 9-1-1 in his first 11 fights before being stopped by future unified light-flyweight champion Ryoichi Taguchi. He bounced back and won his next 8 fights before he defeated Pedro Guevara by split decision to win the WBC light-flyweight title on November 28, 2015. He would go on to lose the title in his first defense to Mexican challenger Ganigan Lopez via majority decision. Kimura announced his retirement from boxing a few months after the Lopez fight.

Professional boxing record

See also
List of light-flyweight boxing champions
List of Japanese boxing world champions

References

External links

1983 births
Living people
People from Chiba (city)
Japanese male boxers
Light-flyweight boxers
World light-flyweight boxing champions
World Boxing Council champions